My Zinc Bed is a play by the British playwright David Hare. It premiered at the Royal Court Theatre in 2000 and its three characters were played in that production by Tom Wilkinson, Julia Ormond and Steven Mackintosh, with Hare himself directing. It was adapted into a television film, in 2008.

References

External links
Royal Court - production page for My Zinc Bed

2000 plays
Plays by David Hare